Lincoln High School is public high school located in Dallas, Texas (USA) which enrolls students in grades 9-12 and is a part of the Dallas Independent School District.

Lincoln's magnet school offers Radio/Television/Film, Print Journalism, and Humanities. Lincoln has a variety of activities including Academic Decathlon, Debate, One Act Play, The Wall Of Sound Marching Band, and a variety of sports. The school has won national and state championships in boys' basketball.

For the 2018-2020 biennium, Lincoln is classified by the University Interscholastic League (UIL) as a 4A Division school, competing in District 4A-5 (Division II) in football, and District 4A-12 in all other sports.

In 2018, the school was rated "Met Standard" by the Texas Education Agency, with a 2-Star Distinction for Academic Achievements in Mathematics and Post Secondary Readiness.

History
In 1937, the Dallas school board appointed a building committee to find land for a new high school for African Americans. The committee chose eleven acres southeast of downtown Dallas, a couple miles north of the confluence of the Trinity River and White Rock Creek.

Dallas architect Walter C. Sharp, responsible for several schools in Arlington, Dallas and Tyler, designed Lincoln High School, and Dolph-Bateson Construction Company served as contractor. The main building was designed in the new International Style that was just becoming popular at the time of its construction. The vertical massing and tower with glass bricks at the entrance made the building a landmark in the neighborhood.

Lincoln High School opened its doors for the first time in January 1939 with 1,255 students and 31 teachers. It was one of the largest campuses in the city, with twenty classrooms, chemistry and physics laboratories, auditorium, cafeteria, and library in the main building. A federal Public Works Administration grant paid for nearly half of the construction cost. The only previous school for blacks, Booker T. Washington, suffered from extreme overcrowding, so many of the first Lincoln students came from Washington.

Tueria Dell Marshall (1883-1960) served as the first principal at the new school, from 1939 to 1955. Marshall is credited with bringing his students quality academic training. He is buried in the historic L. Butler Nelson Cemetery adjacent to his beloved school.

In 1980 a new Lincoln High School was built in front of the original building. The original building is a Dallas Landmark, and a Texas state historical marker was placed in front of the original school building in 2006.

The area of south Dallas around Lincoln has undergone significant gentrification over the last twenty years, and rumors of Lincoln closing have surfaced several times since the 1990s.

Academic performance
In 2011 1.1% of the students, including 3.1% of the Hispanic students and none of the black students, received a " false " or failing grade , as defined by the State of Texas, in SAT and/or ACT. Jim Schutze of the Dallas Observer wrote that the school performed poorly and did not deserve the "high esteem" it received in South Dallas.

Feeder patterns 
As of 2018, Joseph J. Rhoads Learning Center (PK-5) and Charles Rice Elementary School (PK-5) feed into Billy Earl Dade Middle School then into Lincoln. Because Dade MS is the only middle school in south Dallas, it feeds both Lincoln and James Madison high schools. The students that come to Dade from Paul L. Dunbar Elementary School (PK-5), Martin Luther King, Jr. Learning Center (PK-5), and Oran M. Roberts Elementary School (PK-5) attend high school at Madison.

Athletics
The Lincoln Tigers compete in the following sports:

Baseball
Boys Basketball
UIL State Champions - 2015-2016 4A, 2001-2002 4A (40-0, #1 Team in the Nation), 1992-1993 4A, 1989-1990 4A
UIL State Runner Up - 2003-2004 4A, 1996-1997 4A
UIL State Final Four - 2000-2001 4A, 1993-1994 4A
PVIL State Runner Up - 1947-1948 4A, 1943-1944 4A
PVIL State Final Four - 1956-1957 4A, 1955-1956 4A, 1954-1955 4A, 1949-1950 4A, 1946-1947 4A, 1941-1942 4A, 1939-1940 4A
Girls Basketball
State Champions - 2007-2008 4A, 2003-2004 4A (30-1), 1998-1999 4A (31-0)
State Runner-Up - 2012-2013 4A, 2002-2003 4A, 2001-2002 4A, 2000-2001 4A, 1993-1994 4A, 1990-1991 4A
State Final Four - 2010-2011 4A, 2004-2005 4A, 1994-1995 4A, 1989-1990 4A
Cross Country
Football
2004 4A Div 2 State Runner-Up (Lost 33-27 in Double OT to Kilgore)
1959 PVIL 3A State Runner Up
Golf
Soccer
Softball
Swimming and Diving
Tennis
Track and Field
Volleyball
Wrestling

Notable alumni
 Angela Aycock (1991) — Former professional basketball player in the WNBA and internationally. Now a nun known as Sister Paula.
 Arthello Beck (1959) — Self-taught professional artist and gallery owner
 Cedric Lee Juan Tuck "Big Tuck" (1997) — Rapper
 Chris Bosh (2002) — Former NBA basketball player
 Charlie Brackins (1950) — Former NFL football player for the Green Bay Packers. One of the first African-American quarterbacks in the NFL.
 Abner Haynes (1956) — Former NFL football player, primarily for the Dallas Texans and Kansas City Chiefs.
 John Hopps, Jr. (1954) — Physicist; Dr. Hopps became a top physicist and international federal government appointee in two presidential administrations.
 Bobbi Humphrey (1968) — American jazz flutist and singer who plays fusion, jazz-funk and soul-jazz styles.
 Herbie Johnson (1952) — One of the first African-American students to graduate from the North Texas State College, now known as the University of North Texas.
 Le'Bryan Nash — professional basketball player for Maccabi Haifa in the Israeli Basketball Premier League
 David "Fathead" Newman (1951) — Jazz saxophonist
 Andrea Riley (2006) — Professional basketball player in the WNBA and Europe
 Duane Thomas (1965) — Former NFL running back for the Dallas Cowboys and Washington Redskins
 Darren Tillis (1978) — Former NBA basketball player. Taken in the 1st round, 23rd pick of the 1982 NBA Draft by the Boston Celtics.

See also

 History of the African Americans in Dallas-Fort Worth

References

External links 
 
 School profile (PDF)
 Attendance zone map (PDF)

Dallas Independent School District high schools
Public high schools in Dallas
Public magnet schools in Dallas
Historically segregated African-American schools in Texas
School buildings completed in 1980
1980s architecture in the United States